The Ontario Municipal Employees Retirement System (OMERS) is a Canadian public pension fund, headquartered in Toronto, Ontario. OMERS is a defined benefit, jointly sponsored, multi-employer public pension plan created in 1962 by Ontario provincial statute to administer retirement benefits and manage pension investment funds of local government employees in the Canadian province of Ontario. , OMERS had C$124 billion of assets under management. OMERS serves over 1,000 participating employers and more than half a million active, deferred and retired employees. OMERS members are employed by municipalities, school boards, transit systems, local electrical distribution companies, police service boards, fire fighting and paramedic services, children's aid societies and associated local agencies, boards and commissions.

In 2010, this fund assumed the pensions of firefighters, police officers, emergency physicians, employees of the Children's Aid Society, school employees other than teachers, public transport employees and Ontario Hydro employees.

Organization 
OMERS is governed by the Ontario Municipal Employee's Retirement Act, 2006, an Ontario law which superseded the older Ontario Municipal Employees Retirement System Act.

Under the 2006 law, OMERS is composed of two statutory corporations. In 2019, OMERS ventures launched a $315M European Venture fund, a fully owned subsidiary of OMERS Ventures led by Managing Partner Harry Briggs.

OMERS is a partner of the World Economic Forum.

See Also
 Pension fund
 Caisse de dépôt et placement du Québec
 CPP Investment Board
 Ontario Teachers' Pension Plan
 Public Sector Pension Investment Board
 Alberta Investment Management Corporation
 OPTrust

External links
 https://www.omers.com/

References

Profile of OMERS Corporation. Bloomberg. 14:18, 15 November 2021 (UTC).

 
Organizations based in Toronto
Economy of Ontario
Public pension funds in Canada
Investment companies of Canada
Local government in Ontario
Organizations established in 1962
Private equity firms of Canada
1962 establishments in Ontario